New York State Route 27 (NY 27) is a  long state highway that runs east–west from Interstate 278 (I-278) in the New York City borough of Brooklyn to Montauk Point State Park on Long Island, New York. Its two most prominent components are Sunrise Highway and Montauk Highway, the latter of which includes the Montauk Point State Parkway. NY 27 acts as the primary east–west highway on southern Long Island east of the interchange with the Heckscher State Parkway in Islip Terrace. The entire route in Suffolk, Nassau, and Queens counties were designated by the New York State Senate as the POW/MIA Memorial Highway. The highway gives access to every town on the South Shore. NY 27 is the easternmost state route in the state of New York.

NY 27 has service roads that parallel the highway continuously from North Lindenhurst to Patchogue, and intermittently to the east into Southampton. They are officially designated, but not signed, as New York State Route 906C eastbound and New York State Route 906D westbound.

Route description

Prospect Expressway and Linden Boulevard

NY 27 begins at exit 24 of I-278 (the Gowanus Expressway) in the borough of Brooklyn in New York City. For the first stretch through Brooklyn, NY 27 runs along the Prospect Expressway — a sunken six-lane freeway through the Park Slope and Windsor Terrace neighborhoods — providing interchanges with Fourth Avenue, Seventh Avenue, and 11th Avenue. At exit 5, eastbound NY 27 leaves the Prospect Expressway, which then interchanges with Ocean and Fort Hamilton Parkways before ending a short distance to the south at exit 6 and Church Avenue. Eastbound NY 27 follows East 5th Street to Caton Avenue; westbound NY 27 leaves Caton Avenue at Coney Island Avenue, then follows Church Avenue to the Prospect Expressway.

NY 27 runs along Caton Avenue near the south end of Prospect Park. A short distance east, the street merges into Linden Boulevard, crossing eastward through Brooklyn on Linden. NY 27 passes east through East Flatbush and reaches a large intersection with Kings Highway and Remsen Avenue, where it expands into a six-lane boulevard through Brooklyn with frontage roads. East of East 96th Street, NY 27 intersects Rockaway Parkway and then travels under the BMT Canarsie Line, winding through New Lots before turning northeast. After crossing under a nearby subway yard, the boulevard passes through the City Line neighborhood. Near the junction with Ruby Street, NY 27 enters the borough of Queens, but retains the Linden Boulevard name.

Conduit Avenue

Continuing northeast through Queens, NY 27 and Linden Boulevard enter Ozone Park and reach an interchange with Conduit Avenue, where Linden Boulevard ends. NY 27 then continues eastward along the divided Conduit Avenues. This portion of the route becomes a controlled access highway, coterminous with the western portion of Nassau Expressway (NY 878) starting at Cross Bay Boulevard until Aqueduct Road. (When constructed, the portion from Linden Boulevard until what is now Aqueduct Road, was designated Sunrise Highway. This is not to be confused with present Sunrise Highway, which is at the other end of Queens. Sunrise became Conduit at 111th Street, which no longer exists, but is approximately where Aqueduct Road currently crosses over Route 27.)

When the Nassau Expressway splits off, NY 27 continues east along Conduit Avenue and remains a frontage road for multiple exits of the Belt Parkway. The route interchanges with I-678 (the Van Wyck Expressway) a short distance later.

NY 27 remains a frontage road entering Springfield Gardens, crossing multiple exits of the Belt Parkway until entering Laurelton. In Laurelton, the Belt Parkway turns northward while NY 27 continues eastbound as South Conduit Avenue and westbound as Sunrise Highway, but stays a seven-lane divided boulevard (four eastbound and three westbound). The route crosses Francis Lewis Boulevard and south of the Rosedale Long Island Rail Road station; just east of Hook Creek Boulevard, NY 27 enters Nassau County and becomes the Sunrise Highway.

Sunrise Highway

Sunrise Highway begins as a six to eight-lane arterial highway in eastern Queens, directly paralleling the Atlantic and Babylon branches of the Long Island Rail Road. It heads east into Nassau County, passing through Valley Stream, Lynbrook, and Rockville Centre on its way to Merrick. There it connects to the Meadowbrook State Parkway by way of an interchange. NY 27 continues to Wantagh, where it has an interchange with the Wantagh State Parkway. One mile (1.6 km) later, the highway has an interchange with NY 135 in Seaford. In East Massapequa, NY 27 passes under the LIRR and ends its stretch through Nassau.

NY 27 then enters Suffolk County, where it veers to the northeast, bypassing Copiague. At the interchange with NY 109 in West Babylon, Sunrise Highway becomes a six-lane expressway with a two-lane service road on either side. The route then meets the Robert Moses Causeway near West Islip. In East Patchogue, New York, the highway is reduced to a four-lane expressway after passing the NY 112 exit.

Between County Route 16 (CR 16) in Brookhaven and CR 46 in Shirley, the median is lined with pine trees along South Haven County Park. The setting along these roads is similar to the one on the Southern State Parkway west of Belmont Lake State Park. The last exit with a state highway is near Hampton Bays, where it meets NY 24.

East of NY 24, Sunrise Highway crosses over the Shinnecock Canal and has one last eastbound exit before merging with CR 39. It changes names to North Highway, a four-lane undivided highway more commonly known as the Southampton Bypass. The highway continues east near toward village of Southampton before ending at an intersection with Montauk Highway. NY 27 turns east at that junction, following Montauk Highway toward Water Mill and points east.

Montauk Highway

The section of Montauk Highway over which NY 27 runs is two lanes wide, with the exception of the four-lane sections in the village of East Hampton. This section of NY 27 is concurrent with New York State Bicycle Route 27. NY 27 heads generally northeastward to East Hampton village where it becomes Woods Lane, and later, Main Street. It has an intersection with the southern end of NY 114 before entering downtown. After passing Newtown Lane and North Main Street, NY 27's name changes to Pantigo Road, as it passes an eponymous historic district, listed on the National Register of Historic Places.

In the hamlet of Amagansett, NY 27's name changes back to Main Street, again returning to the Montauk Highway name. The road becomes Montauk Point State Parkway as it enters Hither Hills State Park in Napeague. The parkway, a Robert Moses-designed highway, carries NY 27 to its eastern terminus at Montauk Point State Park, on the east side of Montauk. The final 10 miles (16 kilometers) of  NY 27 is known as Montauk Point State Parkway.

History

Designation and early realignments
NY 27's designation was assigned in the mid-1920s to a road extending from the New York City line to Amagansett. It began at the point where Merrick Road exited Queens and entered Nassau County. It mostly followed Merrick Road and Montauk Highway east to Amagansett. From East Patchogue to Brookhaven, NY 27 followed South Country Road, passing through the downtown section of the village of Bellport. The NY 27 designation was extended eastward along Montauk Highway to Montauk Point by 1930.

On February 24, 1930, South Country Road was added to the Suffolk County highway system as CR 36. NY 27 was subsequently realigned to follow Montauk Highway between East Patchogue and Brookhaven.

NY 27 was realigned west of Oakdale  to follow Sunrise Boulevard, a new highway parallel to Merrick Road, and then Montauk Highway, between the New York City line and Massapequa connecting several local roads from Massapequa to Montauk Highway at Oakdale. The former routing of NY 27 from Massapequa to Oakdale became NY 27A, connecting to NY 27 in Massapequa by way of County Line Road.

Sunrise Boulevard was extended eastward to Oakdale  as a realignment of NY 27. One portion of NY 27's former route between NY 27A in Massapequa and the Suffolk County line is known as Old Sunrise Highway, and remains state-maintained to this day as NY 900D, an unsigned reference route.

Sunrise Highway was built over the Brooklyn Waterworks aqueduct, past the south side of Aqueduct Racetrack.

New York City
In December 1934, the route was extended westward into New York City. NY 27 followed Sunrise Highway, Linden Boulevard, and Flatbush Avenue through Queens and Brooklyn to the Manhattan Bridge, where it continued into Manhattan along Canal Street to a terminus at 6th Avenue (then-U.S. Route 1A and later NY 1A).

The route was realigned slightly in the early 1940s to follow Atlantic and Washington Avenues, Eastern Parkway, Buffalo Avenue, and Rockaway Avenue between Flatbush Avenue and Linden Boulevard. NY 27 was again altered in the mid-1960s to continue west on Linden Boulevard, Caton Avenue, and Church Avenue to the south end of the Prospect Expressway. There, the route turned north, following the freeway to its end at the Gowanus Expressway (then-NY 27A), where NY 27A now ends. The Prospect Expressway was planned by Robert Moses, and was constructed during the 1950s.

Prior to 1970, NY 27A continued north to the Holland Tunnel in Manhattan by way of the Gowanus Expressway, the Brooklyn–Battery Tunnel, and the West Side Elevated Highway. On January 1, 1970, NY 27A was truncated eastward to its current western terminus in Massapequa while NY 27 was extended northward along NY 27A's former route to the Holland Tunnel, where it ends at I-78 and NY 9A.

By 1973, NY 27 was cut back to its interchange with the Gowanus Expressway while I-478 was assigned to both the Battery Tunnel and all of the West Side Elevated Highway south of the Lincoln Tunnel.

Long Island

Robert Moses developed plans for an elevated expressway featuring 10 to 12 lanes along Sunrise Highway through Nassau County. This expressway would have provided a truck link for the South Shore of Long Island but the downtown villages along the route effectively put a stop to the idea. 

The portion of Sunrise Highway between North Lindenhurst and the town of Southampton was gradually upgraded to a limited-access highway. At the east end of NY 27 the highway abruptly became a three-lane highway east of the Shinnecock Canal, at the point where NY 27 is concurrent with CR 39. This area was known as the "Shinnecock Squeeze" as traffic on the two-lane eastbound NY 27 was "squeezed" into a single lane.

In 2006 and 2007 Suffolk County and Southampton officials began using traffic cones to adjust the lanes to accommodate peak travel in what was called the "traffic cone program".

At the end of summer 2007, another eastbound lane was added, heading eastward to North Sea Road. The construction snarled traffic on CR 39. The Long Island Rail Road added three trains each way between Speonk and East Hampton during the construction. In April 2008, the three-lane segment from North Sea Road to Flying Point Road was reconfigured from one eastbound and two westbound lanes to two eastbound and one westbound lane. The merge from two lanes to one in the eastbound direction is now assisted by a signalized intersection at Flying Point Road, where eastbound NY 27 traffic makes a left turn onto Montauk Highway. This widening project eliminates the "Shinnecock Squeeze."

Eastward extension
The first proposals for an extension east of the Shinnecock Canal were made in the 1950s. In 1969, the New York Legislature approved a $160 million plan for the extension.  It was a limited-access route, flanked by bicycle and equestrian trails. The eastbound and westbound roadways were to be separated by wide wooded medians.  For the most part, the road was to run a mile or two north of existing NY 27, thus avoiding the populated centers through which it now passes. The extended Sunrise Highway would have had interchanges with CR 38 (North Sea Road) and CR 39 (County Road), CR 79 (Bridgehampton–Sag Harbor Road), NY 114 (East Hampton–Sag Harbor Turnpike), CR 40 (Three Mile Harbor Road), and CR 45 (Amagansett–Springs Road) before merging back into the existing Montauk Highway. The exits would have been sequentially numbered from 67 to 72. The plan failed, and Governor Hugh Carey canceled it in 1975. Other suggestions have included building a limited-access road on either side of Long Island Rail Road's Montauk Branch.

Older interchanges
As Sunrise Highway was upgraded during the 1970s and 1980s many interchanges were redesigned and replaced. The original interchange with the Robert Moses Causeway in West Islip had two parkway-style arch bridges over two lanes of NY 27. When the service roads were built in Western Islip Township between 1969 and 1972, parkway-style bridges were added for them as well. The interchanges at Fifth Ave and Brentwood Road in Bay Shore had parkway-style arch bridges and cloverleaves. When the service roads were added, the parkway-style bridges were removed and replaced with the modern structures that exist today and the original cloverleaves were modified to align with the new service roads.

As with interchanges to the west, Islip Avenue (NY 111) and Carleton Avenue (CR 17) in Islip Terrace originally had parkway-style bridges crossing over Sunrise Highway.  However, only Islip Ave had a partial cloverleaf on the west side of the bridge.  The eastern side of the bridge used side streets for access, as did both sides of the Carleton Ave bridge. This section of Sunrise Highway wasn't divided. Since 1983, both areas have more modern bridges over the service roads, and the old cross streets connect to those service roads or other side roads instead. Islip Avenue connects to NY 27 at exit 45 while Carleton Avenue meets the Sunrise Highway at exit 46.

Proposed interchanges and crossings
Besides the replacement of interchanges in Western Suffolk County, Sunrise Highway has had proposed interchanges and crossings that were either never built or were built according to alternate design specifications.

In the North Lindenhurst area, plans to construct a cloverleaf interchange with CR 2 (Straight Path) in Copiague have existed for some time. In recent years, planners have realized that such an interchange would be too close to the cloverleafs with CR 47 (Great Neck Road) to the west and CR 3 (Wellwood Road) to the east. To further complicate matters, a widened CR 28 was extended to Sunrise Highway near the Straight Path intersection in the late-1980s. To date, no interchange has been built for this area.

The Oakdale Merge is a convergence of Sunrise Highway and Montauk Highway between Great River and Oakdale abutting the southern edge of Connetquot River State Park. The Montauk Highway predates the Sunrise Highway in the area. When Sunrise Highway was extended east of Amityville in 1940, it terminated at Montauk Highway's entrance to Connetquot River State Park.

In 1953, Sunrise Highway was extended to East Patchogue; a  overlap of NY 27 and NY 27A was created, with at-grade intersections connecting the highways. A segment of this alignment remains south of the eastern interchange.

NY 27A was truncated east of the overlap in 1972. Plans to upgrade the interchange have existed since its creation.

During the early-1960s, the Suffolk County Department of Public Works considered designating a county highway to connect Nicolls Road in Lake Grove through the Long Island MacArthur Airport, then on to the east end of the merge. As recently as 1981, the New York State Department of Transportation planned to add service roads and a proper interchange at both ends of the merge. Pressure from environmental groups seeking to avoid damaging the parkland stalled construction. NYSDOT eventually reconstructed Sunrise Highway in eastern Islip township into a freeway during the 1990s, resulting in the present configuration.

The entrance to Connetquot River Park remained as an at-grade intersection, accessible only from the westbound lane. Former segments of Montauk Highway now exist on both sides of the interchange, and sections of both roads were converted into fishing areas owned by the New York State Department of Environmental Conservation. Numerous accidents occurred at the east end of the merge, resulting in its reconstruction in 1999. A new off-ramp to the service road for Pond Road was built, resulting in renumbering of exit 47 to exit 46A.

While none of the interchanges north of Patchogue were built until 1988 to 1993, the New York State Department of Transportation (NYSDOT) had known the need for them and had planned them decades before their eventual construction. As an example, Waverly Avenue (CR 19) was originally proposed as a cloverleaf interchange. Today, exit 52 with CR 19 is a diamond interchange instead. North Ocean Avenue (CR 83) was originally proposed to be accessible via connecting ramps to side streets including Austin Street along the eastbound lane and Sinn Street along the westbound lane. Today, exit 53A is a half-diamond interchange while Austin Street and Howard Street are now dead-end streets, and Sinn Street never reached North Ocean Avenue.

Maple Avenue had crossed the median on NY 27 between North Ocean Avenue and NY 112 until 1975. This road could also have been used as a connecting ramp to both roads. Today, the north section only intersects the westbound service road, while the south section was converted into a dead-end street north of Austin Street. NY 112 was originally proposed to be accessible via connecting ramps to side streets such as Franklin Street along the eastbound lane and an extension of Sinn Street along the westbound lane.

Sinn Street was acquired by NYSDOT east of NY 112 in the early-1960s, and was gradually abandoned. Today, exit 53 is a diamond interchange, and Sinn Street, Austin Street, and Franklin Street are now dead-end streets. Originally there were proposals to connect Washington Avenue and Phyllis Drive via ramps to side streets such as Franklin Street along the eastbound lane, and to an extension of Sinn Street along the westbound lane.

Phyllis Drive was once part of NY 27 until Sunrise Highway was extended to Eastport in 1957. Today, both roads are only accessible via the service roads. Some residents are waiting for a potential pedestrian bridge connecting the two ends of Washington Avenue.

West of the Carmans River near Southaven County Park in South Haven, there was a plan to combine the eastbound service road with Montauk Highway, similar to the Oakdale Merge.

NY 27A

NY 27A is an alternate route of NY 27 across southern Long Island from Massapequa Park to Oakdale, accessing Babylon and Islip. It was designated NY 27A .

Major intersections

See also

References

External links

 The traffic circle at the eastern terminus of NY 27 at Montauk Point
 NYC Roads article on NY 27
 NY 27 (Greater New York Roads)
 Oakdale Merge @ Empire State Roads.com
 NYCroads.com – Prospect Expressway (NY 27)
 NYSDOT – Gowanus Project

027
Roads on Long Island
Transportation in Nassau County, New York
Transportation in Suffolk County, New York
East Hampton (town), New York
Streets in Queens, New York
Expressways in New York City
Limited-access roads in New York (state)
Transportation in Brooklyn